Towering Inferno may refer to:

  The Towering Inferno, 1974 disaster movie
  Towering Inferno (band), an English experimental music group which released the 1993 album Kaddish
  Towering Inferno (video game), for the Atari 2600

See also